John Newbold (died 1415/16), of Whissendine, Rutland, was an English politician.

Family
At some point by 1409, Newbold had married a woman named Margaret. It is unrecorded as to whether they had children. His parentage is unclear.

Career
He was a Member (MP) of the Parliament of England for Rutland in November 1414. He was a close associate of his fellow MP, Roger Flower. He died shortly before February 1416.

References

14th-century births
1416 deaths
English MPs November 1414
People from Whissendine